Gulong Itlog Gulong (English translation: Roll Egg Roll) is the third studio album and fourth overall album of the Filipino alternative rock band Parokya ni Edgar, released in 1999 by Universal Records. The album received Platinum certification from the Philippine Association of the Record Industry, Inc. in September 24, 1999.

Track listing

Album credits
Executive Producer: Bella Tan
Recorded at: Pink House Studio by Jun Reyes
Digitally Mastered at: Tracks Studios by Angee Rozul
Album Concept by: Parokya ni Edgar
Design & Art Direction: Graphic Axcess Inc
Photography by: Allen Villalon Studios

Awards and nominations

References

External links 
 
 Official website

1999 albums
Parokya ni Edgar albums
Universal Records (Philippines) albums